Gomes Echigues (1010–1065) was a medieval Knight, Governor of the District of Entre-Douro-e-Minho and Lord of Felgueiras.

Gomes was the son of Echega Guiçoi and Aragunta Soares, maternal granddaughter of Diego Rodríguez Porcelos. His wife was Gontrode Moniz, daughter of Mono Fernandes de Touro.

References

External links 
our-royal-titled-noble-and-commoner-ancestors.com

1010 births
1065 deaths
11th-century Portuguese people
Portuguese nobility
Portuguese Roman Catholics